The Door Between is a 1917 American silent drama film directed by Rupert Julian and starring Ruth Clifford, Monroe Salisbury and George A. McDaniel. It is adapted from a story that appeared in serialized editions in McClure's Magazine in 1913-14.

Plot 
Archibald Crocker, an American alcoholic, visits a geisha house in Japan where the scientist Dr. Anthony Ives Eckhart is staying to study Asian music. Dr. Eckhart discovers that Crocker has come to Asia to kill his wife Heloise in revenge for leaving him. After Dr. Eckhart leaves for Beijing and finds Heloise, they fall in love. After Crocker arrives, Dr. Eckhart convinces him to consider sparing Heloise and seeking a legal separation instead. However, an hour later he arrives at Eckhart and Heloise's hotel to kill her. Crocker breaks his leg after Eckhart pushes him down a flight of stairs, and he decides to kill himself. Archibald and Heloise marry afterwards.

Cast
 Ruth Clifford as Heloise Crocker
 Monroe Salisbury as Anthony Ives Eckhart
 George A. McDaniel as Archibald Crocker
 W. H. Bainbridge as Sir Robert

References

Bibliography
 Robert B. Connelly. The Silents: Silent Feature Films, 1910-36, Volume 40, Issue 2. December Press, 1998.

External links
 

1917 films
1917 drama films
1910s English-language films
American silent feature films
Silent American drama films
American black-and-white films
Universal Pictures films
Films directed by Rupert Julian
Films set in Japan
Films set in Beijing
Films set in the Republic of China (1912–1949)
1910s American films